= Hireheggadahal =

Hireheggadahal is a village in the southern state of Karnataka, India.

== See also ==
- Bellary
- Districts of Karnataka
